Galboda Gnanissara Thera, one of the most respected Buddhist prelates, is the head priest and the chief incumbent of the Gangaramaya Temple in Colombo, Sri Lanka. He is also popularly known as Podi Hamuduruwo, which translates to "Little Monk". In 2003, Thera was appointed by Malwatta chapter as the Sanghanayaka of the Western Province in Sri Lanka. He was also the Sanghanayaka of the Sri Lankan Buddhist temples in the United States but renounced that position later. Thera is widely recognized for various community service endeavors undertaken by him.

Early life
Galboda Gnanissara Thera was born in 1943 in the village Galboda in the Matara Municipal Council, Sri Lanka. At the age of eight, he was brought to the Gangaramaya temple to be ordained. It was then that he was given the name "Podi Hamuduruwo" (Little Monk).

Ordination & Consecration
At the age of eight, Galboda Gnanissara Thera was brought to the Gangaramaya temple to be ordained. Dewundara Ratanajothi (Devundara Vaccissara Thera) who was then the Chief Incumbent of the temple was one of his teachers. By 1959, Devundara Vaccissara Thera was ailing, had gone visually impaired and disabled. Due to his disability, the temple leadership including Vaccissara Thera himself asked Galboda Gnanissara Thera to take over the administration of the temple. He was 16 years old at that time. After taking over administration of the temple, Galboda Gnanissara Thera collected LKR 500 to meet the medical expanses of ailing Devundara Vaccissara Thera.

In 2003, Galboda Gnanissara Thera was appointed by Malwatta Chapter as the Sanghanayaka of the Western Province in Sri Lanka. He was also the Sanghanayaka of the Sri Lankan Buddhist temples in the United States but renounced the position later. The Asgiriya Chapter has awarded “Darshana Visharada” to him which is equivalent to a doctorate degree.

Community service
Galboda Gnanissara Thera has initiated several community service projects in Sri Lanka, Staten Island, Birmingham and in Singapore. The community services are primarily in fields of vocational education, homeless shelters for children & elderly people, sanitation and cleanliness. In the field of vocational education, the Gangaramaya temple provides gratis vocational training. Over 7,000 people attend the classes daily and training for over 50 technical courses is imparted. Training is held in the "Sri Jinaratana Training Institute" and some of the subjects are secretarial courses, English language, electronics, motor mechanism, bricolage (tinkering), painting, blacksmith, welding, electric wiring etc.

Galboda Gnanissara Thera started old age home, which is operated by the Gangaramaya temple in Kataragama. The old age home is run primarily as a homeless shelter for old people who have been abandoned by their families or have no family. In Kataragama and in Kotte, he has started orphanages. Open to children from all religions, the orphanages provide shelter, schooling and upbringing to children abandoned by their parents. Children with intellectual disability and physical disability are also accommodated there.

Galboda Gnanissara Thera also set up the Sumangala Dhamma School and a preschool on the island Singithi Uyana. Towards sanitation and cleanliness, he has raised money and donated toiletries and urinals to various monastic schools in Sri Lanka. In order to set an example and to promote sanitation and cleanliness, he has been spotted washing and cleaning toilets.

See also
Gangaramaya Temple
Hikkaduwe Sri Sumangala Thera
Seema Malaka

References 

1943 births
Living people
Sri Lankan Buddhist monks
Sinhalese monks